Gamewave or Game Wave may refer to:
 An abbreviation for the Game Wave Family Entertainment System video game console and DVD player
 A rarely used alternate term for chiptune and bitpop music
 The Gamewave Group Limited, an online MMORPG game provider in China.